Sylwan is the oldest scientific journal covering forestry in the world that is still in print. It was established in 1820 as the semi-official organ of the Royal Forestry Corps in Poland. Since 1925 it has been published by the Polish Forest Society.

Abstracting and indexing 
Sylwan is abstracted and indexed in the Science Citation Index Expanded, CAB International, and Polish Scientific Journal Contents. According to the Journal Citation Reports, the journal has a 2018 impact factor of 0.691.

See also 
 List of forestry journals

References

External links 
 

Publications established in 1820
Forestry journals
Forestry in Poland
Polish-language journals
Monthly journals
Academic journals published by learned and professional societies
Hijacked journals
Academic journals published in Poland